Tarnished Reputations is a 1920 American silent adventure drama film directed by Alice Guy-Blaché (which is her last), supervised by  Léonce Perret and starring Dolores Cassinelli, Alan Roscoe, and Georges Deneubourg. It is presumed to be a lost film.

Plot
As described in a film magazine, Helen Sanderson (Cassinelli) has become infatuated with Robert Williams (Roscoe), a painter who has come to her small village. While painting The Saint Among the Lillies in which Helen is the model, their friendship develops into love. Helen receives a rude awakening when Robert suddenly departs, leaving only a letter to say goodbye. After the death of her aunt, Helen goes to New York to see her sweetheart after he has found fame with his painting, but finds that he has departed for Europe to paint a portrait of the Pope. In financial straits, Helen goes to a garment shop to make a living. One night she is wrongly accused of accosting a man, and is sentenced to jail for thirty days. After her release, she visits Judge Princeton (Burton) from her case. There she meets author George de Wendbourg (Deneubourg), who offers aid. He takes her home and develops her into a great actress in his play. Robert then returns from Europe and her love for him returns.

Cast
 Dolores Cassinelli as Helen Sanderson
 Alan Roscoe as Robert Williams (credited as Albert Roscoe)
 Georges Deneubourg as George de Wendbourg
 Ned Burton as Judge Princeton

Production
The working title for the film was A Soul Adrift.

References

External links

1920 films
American silent feature films
Films directed by Herbert Blaché
American black-and-white films
Lost American films
American adventure drama films
1920s adventure drama films
Pathé Exchange films
1920 lost films
Lost adventure drama films
1920 drama films
1920s American films
Silent American drama films
Silent adventure drama films
1920s English-language films
English-language drama films